The Doob–Meyer decomposition theorem is a theorem in stochastic calculus stating the conditions under which a submartingale may be decomposed in a unique way as the sum of a  martingale and an increasing predictable process. It is named for Joseph L. Doob and Paul-André Meyer.

History
In 1953, Doob published the Doob decomposition theorem which gives a unique decomposition for certain discrete time martingales. He conjectured a continuous time version of the theorem and in two publications in 1962 and 1963 Paul-André Meyer proved such a theorem, which became known as the Doob-Meyer decomposition. In honor of Doob, Meyer used the term "class D" to refer to the class of supermartingales for which his unique decomposition theorem applied.

Class D supermartingales
A càdlàg supermartingale  is of Class D if  and the collection

is uniformly integrable.

The theorem 
Let  be a cadlag supermartingale of class D. Then there exists a unique, increasing, predictable process  with  such that  is a uniformly integrable martingale.

See also
Doob decomposition theorem

Notes

References

Martingale theory
Theorems in statistics
Probability theorems